The 1952–53 OB I bajnokság season was the 16th season of the OB I bajnokság, the top level of ice hockey in Hungary. Nine teams participated in the league, and Postas Budapest won the championship.

Regular season

2nd place game
 Kinizsi SE Budapest - Vörös Meteor Budapest 5:3

References

External links
 Season on hockeyarchives.info

Hun
OB I bajnoksag seasons
1952–53 in Hungarian ice hockey